The 2010–11 VfB Stuttgart season was the 118th season in the club's football history. They competed in the Bundesliga, the top tier of German football, in which they finished 12th as well as competing in the DFB-Pokal, where they were eliminated in the Round of 16. Following a sixth-place finish in the previous season, they competed in the Europa League, where they were eliminated in the round of 32. It was Stuttgart's 34th consecutive season in the league, since having been promoted from the 2. Bundesliga in 1977.

Season summary
During the previous season, Stuttgart finished 6th in the Bundesliga. As a result, they qualified for the qualification stages of the Europa League. Stuttgart started the season poorly, and manager Christian Gross was sacked on 13 October, with the club bottom of the league. Jens Keller was appointed as his replacement on a temporary basis before Bruno Labbadia was appointed as his permanent replacement on 12 December. The club were knocked out of the DFB-Pokal in the round of 16 by Bayern Munich, and were knocked out of the Europa League in the round of 32 by Benfica. They finished 12th in the Bundesliga on 42 points.

Players

First-team squad

Left club during season

Competitions

Overview

Bundesliga

League table

DFB-Pokal

UEFA Europa League

Qualifying stage

Group stage

Knockout stage

Notes

References

VfB Stuttgart seasons
Stuttgart, VfB
Stuttgart, VfB